Laoliangcang is a town in Ningxiang City, Hunan Province, China. It is surrounded by Huangcai Town on the northwest, Hengshi Town on the northeast, Shuangfupu Town on the east, Huitang Town on the southeast, and Liushahe Town on the southwest. It is famous for the bronze culture of the Shang culture.

Administrative division

The town is divided into eight villages and two communities: 
 Laoliangcang Community
 Tangshi Community
 Changtian
 Huichuntang
 Jianghua
 Jinhong
 Shuangou
 Maogongqiao
 Xingshi
 Wangjiang

Geography
Chu River is known as "Liushahe"(), a tributary of the Wei River, it flows through the town.

Economy
Citrus, prunus mume and tobacco are important to the economy.

Education

There is one Senior high school located with the town limits: Ningxiang Sixth Senior High School. Public junior high school in the town include the Laoliangcang Junior High School, Maogongqiao Junior High School, Tangshi Junior High School. Primary schools in the town include the Laoliangcang Central School, Laoliangcang School, Tangshi School

Culture
Huaguxi is the most influence local theater.

Wangbai Mountain and Lanshan Mountain are the scenic spots in the town.

Transportation

County Road
The County Road X096 runs southeast to Huitang Town.

The County Road X098 runs east to Mount Huilong Scenic Spot.

The County Road X105 intersects with the County Road X104.

Provincial Highway 
Among the major highways that connect Laoliangcang Town to the rest of Hunan Province include S209, which runs south through Qingshanqiao Town to Hutian Town and north to Hengshi Town.

Expressway 
The S71 Yiyang-Loudi-Hengyang Expressway, which connects Yiyang, Loudi and Hengyang, runs south through Liushahe Town and Hutian Town to its southern terminus at the junction of Changsha-Shaoshan-Loudi Expressway, and the north through Hengshi Town, Yujia'ao Township and Huishangang Town to Heshan District of Yiyang.

Railway 
The Luoyang–Zhanjiang railway, from Luoyang City, Henan Province to Zhanjiang City, Guangdong Province, through Laoliangcang Town at Laoliangcang Railway Station.

Attractions
The Yunshan School, built in late Qing dynasty (1644–1911), now it is the famous scenic site.

References

External links
 

Divisions of Ningxiang
Ningxiang